The 927th Combat Sustainment Support Battalion is a component of the 50th Regional Support Group in the Army National Guard of the United States. Its headquarters are located at Camp Blanding in Florida. Five companies are part of the 927th Combat Service Support Battalion:
 256th Area Support Medical Company
 153rd Financial Management Support Unit
 927th Headquarters Company
 631st Maintenance Company
 856th Quartermaster Company

The battalion headquarters returned from Operation Iraqi Freedom April 2008. LTC Valeria Gonzalez-Kerr and CSM Sally M Bailey was the first all woman command team in Iraq.

References

Battalions of the United States Army National Guard
Military units and formations in Florida
CSSB 0927